Sara Mason may refer to:

Sara Mason (actress) in Sell a Door Theatre Company
Sara Mason (rally driver) in 2007 World Rally Championship season

See also
Sarah Mason (disambiguation)